Bozonnet is a French surname. Notable people with the surname include:

Marcel Bozonnet (born 1944), French actor
Ulysse Bozonnet (1922–2014), French mountain infantry soldier and skier

French-language surnames